The 2018 California's 39th congressional district election was held on Tuesday, November 6, 2018, with a primary election being held on June 5, 2018.

This election was one of several 53 House elections that was held in California and 435 nationwide, but it had been called "the weirdest race in the country" due to an over-abundance of Democratic candidates potentially spoiling the ability for any Democrats to place first or second in the primary. Under election rules the top two vote-getters in the jungle primary advanced to the November general election, regardless of party affiliation.

The primary election was held on June 5, 2018.  Republican Assemblywoman Young Kim and Democrat Gil Cisneros came in first and second place respectively, assuaging fears that two candidates from the same party would advance.

The general election was held on November 6. On November 17, AP News projected that Cisneros had won the election.

Background

The 39th district straddles the Los Angeles–Orange–San Bernardino tri-county border and includes Chino Hills, Diamond Bar, and Fullerton.

In January 2018, Republican Ed Royce, who had represented the 39th district since 2013 and previously represented the 40th district from 2003 to 2013 and the 39th district from 1993 to 2003, announced his plans not to run for reelection. During his tenure in Congress, Royce was chairman of the United States House Committee on Foreign Affairs.  According to Rep. Steve Stivers, Republicans needed to win in suburban districts like Orange County's to hold their majority.

After Royce's retirement, the district was considered a prime opportunity for a Democratic pickup, citing dissatisfaction with the Trump administration and the strength of Hillary Clinton's 8 percent lead in the district's vote in the 2016 United States presidential election. The proportion of voters in the district who were registered Republican dropped from 40 to 35 percent since 2012, but Republicans believed that their turnout would be significantly larger than Democrats'. Moreover, as of January 2018, there were still more voters in the district registered as Republicans than as Democrats (128,375 to 123,849).

Democrats hoped to have a demographic advantage in this district, since it was less than 30 percent white. However, several commentators (including Cook) speculated that an Asian American nominee would have an edge in this district, regardless of party, as Democrat Jay Chen did against Royce in the 2012 district election. In 2018, the district was conservative and upper-middle class with only 35 percent of the population identifying as Hispanic and the majority identifying as white or Asian. Specifically, Asians made up around 32 percent of the district.

Royce's retirement led the Cook Political Report to move CA-39 from lean Republican to lean Democratic. The New York Times rated this district a tossup.

Primary election
The primary election in 2018 had a large number of Democrats and Republicans. As the election drew near, Democratic organizations like the Democratic Congressional Campaign Committee (DCCC) became concerned that the flood of Democratic candidates might split the vote, causing two Republicans to win the nomination. In June, the race was reported to be the most expensive race in California, drawing $10 million in spending. A majority of the spending was attributed to Democratic frontrunners Gil Cisneros and Andy Thorburn, who were able to personally fund their own respective campaigns, and ran increasingly negative ads targeting one another. On June 5, Republican Young Kim and Democrat Gil Cisneros finished in first and second place, advancing to the general election.

Candidates
The district had 17 candidates heading into the June 5 primary — six Democrats, seven Republicans, two American Independents and two no party preference candidates.

A poll from Fight Back California PAC found that when presented with a list of the three Republicans and four Democrats with some name recognition, Republican Young Kim led the pack with 21 percent of the vote, followed by Republican Bob Huff (19 percent), Democrat Gil Cisneros (16 percent), and Democrat Andy Thorburn (16 percent).

During the primary, initially seven Democratic candidates split the vote in the district, all but blocking the party from making an endorsement there; the district was one of three (the other two being the 48th and 49th) that Democrats were concerned they could lose in the primary due to vote-splitting. The party held a pre-endorsement conference in January and urged some candidates to withdraw.

Although the Democratic Congressional Campaign Committee backed Gil Cisneros, including by adding him to its "Red to Blue" program, which offered designated candidates financial and organizational support, it did not officially endorse him. Tran was endorsed by Emily's List and by the Feminist Majority Foundation. The California and Orange County Democratic parties did not endorse anyone. Thorburn has been endorsed by the California Nurses Association.

Scientist Phil Janowicz dropped out of the race to avoid splitting the Democratic vote. Potential candidate Jay Chen also opted not to run, saying, "The greatest contribution I can make right now is to help consolidate the field, by stepping away from it." The DCCC praised his move. Chen's dropping out was cited as an example of how self-funding millionaires drove less wealthy Democrats out of California primaries, as Cisneros obtained his wealth from winning a Mega Millions lottery jackpot.

Republicans were less eager than Democrats to thin the herd of candidates, which is why the Young Guns program includes both Kim and Nelson on its list.

Republican
Republican candidates campaigned chiefly on increased border security and an end to California sanctuary state law.

Bob Huff
Bob Huff is a former state senator who represented California's 29th State Senate district.

Young Kim
Young Kim is a former Assemblywoman who represented California's 65th State Assembly district. She emigrated from South Korea in 1975, graduated from University of Southern California in 1981, worked in a bank and then as a controller of a ladieswear manufacturing firm, and served in Royce's congressional office for 21 years as community liaison and director of Asian affairs and has received Royce's endorsement.

Kim said she wants to create jobs and keep taxes low. She said she wanted to increase border security and ensure those brought to the U.S. "as children without legal documentation are treated fairly and with compassion."

Phil Liberatore
Phil Liberatore is a Certified Public Accountant, founder of IRS Problem Solvers, and author of God, Money and You.

Shawn Nelson
Shawn Nelson was a former Orange County Supervisor at the time of the election; he is now a top official in the Orange County District Attorney's office.

Democratic 
Democratic candidates advocated for tax reform to end tax cuts for the wealthy. and supported universal health care. The candidates supported banning assault weapons and implementing universal background checks on gun purchases. Democratic candidate Andy Thorburn sent out mailers accusing candidate Gil Cisneros of investing millions of dollars in gun industry stock.

Andy Thorburn
Andy Thorburn is a former teacher and union activist who made his wealth in the insurance business. He was CEO of Foothill Ranch-based Global Benefits Group from 2005 to 2015, and remains its largest stockholder. Thorburn supported a Medicare for all healthcare system.

Gil Cisneros
Gil Cisneros is a Navy veteran and former shipping and distribution manager at Frito-Lay who won a lottery jackpot of $266 million with his wife in 2010. Cisneros raised the issue of homelessness among veterans, vowing to fight any attempts to defund or weaken HUD-VASH.

Sam Jammal
Sam Jammal is a former Obama administration official.

Mai Khanh Tran
Mai Khanh Tran is a pediatrician. Despite pressure from Democratic officials, she has refused to drop out, saying she is "the only qualified woman, the only immigrant and the only physician in the race".

Primary election polling

Fundraising
Millionaires Andy Thorburn and Gil Cisneros have loaned their campaigns $2.3 million and $2 million respectively. As of March 31, Kim raised more than $600,000, according to FEC filings, fourth most in the race and the most for a Republican. Kim received $178,000 in mailers and web ads, and $316,998 altogether, from The American Future Fund. The California Freedom and Prosperity Fund PAC spent about $85,000 opposing Kim, while spending five figures boosting Nelson.

In May, the race in the 39th district had seen the fourth most money spent of any House race in the nation. As of June, $10 million had been spent, making the race the most expensive in the state.

Advertising 
Young Kim was the first Republican in the election to launch a TV ad. The ad highlights her connection to Royce, her record as a state legislator, and her family history. Two Democrats in the race, Navy veteran and lottery winner Gil Cisneros and Andy Thorburn, also launched TV ads in April. Sam Jammal narrated an advertisement from a dog's point of view.

As of May 15, 2018, House Majority PAC and Priorities USA Action planned to air ads targeting Bob Huff and Shawn Nelson, in an effort to help their chosen candidate, Cisneros. The Democratic Congressional Campaign Committee, a week prior, had made a nearly $450,000 ad buy targeting those same two candidates. The anti-Nelson ad accuses him of hypocrisy over pensions. The anti-Huff ad says, "He huffs and he puffs but would make your taxes go up."

The DCCC ads did not target Young Kim, who was seen as the leading Republican and was endorsed by Royce to succeed him, since the purpose of the ads was to put a Democrat in the top two by ensuring that Kim is the only Republican to reach the general election. As of May, the DCCC undertook an operation including mailers and digital ads (via platforms such as Google, Facebook, Instagram, and Snapchat), aimed at registering and turning out the party's voters.

Cisneros and Thorburn each launched dueling websites panning their rival. Cisneros's campaign accused Thorburn of tax-evasion, while Thorburn's camp has a site calling Cisneros a gun lover. In May, California Democratic Party Chairman Eric Bauman announced that he had helped to engineer a deal between Thorburn and Cisneros to stop attacking each other and instead focus on "promoting their positive visions" and "highlighting their contrast with the corrupt, incompetent Trump Republicans." Both candidates took down their negative websites against each other.

In May, the DCCC announced its first Spanish-language midterm TV ad in favor of Cisneros. The ad criticized Republicans for trying to cut funds for education and student aid, and for denying  a path to citizenship. Meanwhile, House Majority PAC sent out mailing pieces to Republican and independent voters tying Phil Liberatore to President Trump, a move to raise the underfunded Liberatore's name recognition and try to siphon off votes from other GOP candidates to him. The ads point out Liberatore's desire for a border wall and an end to sanctuary cities, and his endorsement by Joe Arpaio.

Primary results

General election 
The primary election was held on June 5, 2018. Under election rules the top two vote-getters in the jungle primary advanced to November, regardless of party affiliation. Republican Assemblywoman Young Kim and Democrat Gil Cisneros came in first and second place respectively, advancing to the general election.

Debates

Complete video of debate, October 16, 2018

Predictions

Polling
In the three months prior to the election FiveThirtyEight projected a close election, with Kim and Cisneros each respectively having a 65.2% and 62.2% chance of winning at their peak.

Results 
The general election was held on November 6. In the first few days following the election, Young Kim was leading in the early reported results. However, ballots in California only have to be postmarked on election day, and other races in California have shifted from Republican election night leads to Democratic victories. The Mercury News reports speculation that Democratic swings in the days following the election are "due to Democratic voters being more likely to cast their ballots on election day or mail them in at the last minute, instead of voting early". This is a documented example of the American electoral phenomenon of blue shift. Over the next few days, Cisneros pulled ahead of Young Kim. On November 17, AP News projected that Cisneros had won the election. County officials published their final results on December 7, 2018.

Results by county
Results by county. Blue represents counties won by Cisneros. Red represents counties won by Kim.

References

2018 39
California 39
United States House of Representatives 39